Kilis Province is a province in southern Turkey, on the border with Syria. It used to be the southern part of the province of Gaziantep and was formed in 1994. The city of Kilis is home to over 75% of the inhabitants of the province; the other towns and villages are very small.

Districts

The province is divided into 4 districts, listed below with their official estimates of population as of 2022: Elbeyli (5,594), Kilis (the capital district) (125,079), Musabeyli (12,390) and Polateli (4,856).

See also 
List of populated places in Kilis Province

References

External links

  Kilis governor's official website
  Kilis municipality's official website
  Kilis weather forecast information